Ferschweiler is a municipality in the district of Bitburg-Prüm, in Rhineland-Palatinate, western Germany.

Notable people

Henri Tudor - engineer, inventor and industrialist

References

Bitburg-Prüm